Alonso Wong (born 10 June 1993) is a Peruvian judoka. He won the silver medal in the men's 73 kg event at the 2019 Pan American Games held in Lima, Peru.

Career 
He won the silver medal in the men's 66 kg event at the 2014 Pan American Judo Championships held in Guayaquil, Ecuador. In the following years, he competed in the 73 kg weight class. He won one of the bronze medals in the men's 73 event at this competition, both in 2016 and in 2018.

In 2020, he repeated this for the third time by winning one of the bronze medals in the men's 73 kg event at the Pan American Judo Championships held in Guadalajara, Mexico. In 2021, he competed in the men's 73 kg event at the World Judo Championships held in Budapest, Hungary.

References

External links
 

Living people
1993 births
Place of birth missing (living people)
Peruvian male judoka
Pan American Games medalists in judo
Pan American Games silver medalists for Peru
Judoka at the 2019 Pan American Games
Medalists at the 2019 Pan American Games
20th-century Peruvian people
21st-century Peruvian people